Kiveton Park Colliery Cricket Club is an English cricket club based in Kiveton Park, South Yorkshire.

History
The club has been a member of the Bassetlaw and District Cricket League since its inception in 1904. The first team did compete in an ECB Premier League competition (the Nottinghamshire Premier League) for the 2011 season after winning the Bassetlaw League a year earlier, but were relegated back after just one year.

Notable players

 Harry Chapman
 Bert Morley
 Mike Smedley

References

External links
 Official Site
 Page on Bassetlaw and District Cricket League website

English club cricket teams
Cricket in South Yorkshire
Cricket clubs established in 1879
1879 establishments in England